Joop Brand (born 11 June 1936) is a Dutch former football player and manager.

Playing career
A defender, Brand played for Xerxes, DFC, HVC and Heracles Almelo.

Managerial career
Brand coached DWS, HFC Haarlem, AZ, Go Ahead Eagles, Sparta Rotterdam and Telstar.

He was appointed head of the Sparta academy after working as caretaker manager at FC VVV.

Brand was dismissed as head of Vitesse's football academy in 2003 after criticizing the club's directors. He was named academy manager at ADO Den Haag, but resigned before he ever worked for the club and left them for PSV in summer 2003. He quit PSV in 2006. He later worked for amateur side IJsselmeervogels.

References

External links
 Profile 

1936 births
Living people
Dutch footballers
Footballers from Rotterdam
Association football defenders
XerxesDZB players
FC Dordrecht players
Heracles Almelo players
Dutch football managers
AFC DWS managers
HFC Haarlem managers
AZ Alkmaar managers
Go Ahead Eagles managers
Sparta Rotterdam managers
SC Telstar managers
VVV-Venlo managers